William Wells Hewitt ARCO (8 November 1898 - 10 October 1966) was an English organist and composer who spent much of his working life in Canada.

Education

He was born on 8 November 1898 in Scarborough, Yorkshire, the son of Thomas Robert Hewitt and Mary Elizabeth Cooke.

He studied music under Dr. George Bennett at Lincoln Cathedral for 10 years, becoming his assistant organist.

He served in the Royal Air Force in the First World War.

On 11 April 1928 he married Katharine Kitty Markham in Stratford  upon Avon.

He was Chairman of the Toronto Centre of the Royal Canadian College of Organists from 1940 to 1942.

Appointments

Assistant Organist of  Lincoln Cathedral 1922 - 1926
Organist of the Church of the Holy Trinity, Stratford-upon-Avon 1926 - 1933
Organist of St. James' Cathedral, Toronto 1933 -  1956
Organist of Appleby College 1940-44

Compositions

He composed two hymn tunes, Stratford-upon-Avon and Nunc Dimitte.

References

1898 births
1966 deaths
Cathedral organists
English emigrants to Canada
English organists
British male organists
Fellows of the Royal College of Organists
People from Scarborough, North Yorkshire
Royal Air Force personnel of World War I
20th-century classical musicians
20th-century English musicians
Place of death missing
20th-century organists
20th-century British male musicians
Male classical organists